Peter Houston Kostmayer (born September 27, 1946) is a Democratic politician who served seven terms in the U.S. House of Representatives from Bucks County, Pennsylvania.

Early life and career

Kostmayer was born in New York City, graduated from West Nottingham Academy in Colora, Maryland, in 1965, and received a B.A. from Columbia University in New York City in 1971.

Kostmayer worked as a reporter from 1971 to 1972.  He served as press secretary to Pennsylvania Attorney General J. Shane Cramer from 1972 to 1973 and deputy press secretary to Governor Milton Shapp from 1973 to 1976.

Congress
Following the retirement of U.S. Rep. Edward Biester in 1976, Kostmayer ran against State Representative John S. Renninger for the open seat in Pennsylvania's 8th congressional district.  With Jimmy Carter winning Pennsylvania in the 1976 election, Kostmayer won by a 1,312 vote margin.  He won re-election in 1978 against G. Roger Bowers with 61% of the vote.  He lost in 1980 with Ronald Reagan sweeping to victory, Republican James Coyne narrowly defeated Kostmayer.

Kostmayer won back the seat in a 1982 rematch by 2,300 votes.  Kostmayer won re-election in 1984 over David Christian by fewer than 4,000 votes.  He then enjoyed victories in 1986 over David Christian again by a much larger margin and in 1988 over PA Republican State Senator Edward Howard and then again in 1990 over Bucks County Clerk of Courts, Audrey Zettick. In 1992, Kostmayer faced State Senator James C. Greenwood, who had been a legislative aide to Kostmayer's first opponent, John Renninger.  Greenwood defeated Kostmayer with almost 52% of the vote.

Later career
Kostmayer became the Administrator, Region III (Philadelphia) of the Environmental Protection Agency from 1994 to 1995. Later, he served as the President of Zero Population Growth.  He entered the race for Pennsylvania State Senate in 2002 against incumbent Senator Tommy Tomlinson.  Kostmayer was defeated, taking 47% in the general election.

Kostmayer is the retired CEO of the Citizens Committee for New York City and lives in Clinton Hill, Brooklyn.

Personal life
In 1982, Kostmayer married Pamela Jones Rosenberg, a businesswoman with two children from her previous marriage.  They divorced in 1991.

References

External links

1946 births
Living people
Columbia University School of General Studies alumni
Democratic Party members of the United States House of Representatives from Pennsylvania
Sustainability advocates
People from Bucks County, Pennsylvania
Politicians from New York City
West Nottingham Academy alumni
Members of Congress who became lobbyists